The discography of The June Junes, an American-Mexican pop band, contains one Music single. The June Junes debut single, She's the Latest One - Single, was released by Intermusic Group LLC worldwide on May 31, 2011.

Soundtracks

Singles

The June Junes singles

Music videos

References

June Junes